Peter Matti (born 22 June 1965) is a Swiss slalom canoeist who competed from the mid-1980s to the late 1990s. Competing in two Summer Olympics, he earned his best finish of fifth in the C2 event in Barcelona in 1992.

He is the European Champion in C2 from 1996.

His partner in the boat throughout the whole of his active career was his brother Ueli Matti.

World Cup individual podiums

References
Sports-reference.com profile

1965 births
Canoeists at the 1992 Summer Olympics
Canoeists at the 1996 Summer Olympics
Living people
Olympic canoeists of Switzerland
Swiss male canoeists